Euphorbia sikkimensis, called the Sikkim spurge, is a species of flowering plant in the genus Euphorbia, native to Nepal, the eastern Himalayas, Tibet, south-central and southeast China, Myanmar, and Vietnam. It grows in alpine meadows, sparse forests, and scrub. It has gained the Royal Horticultural Society's Award of Garden Merit.

References

sikkimensis
Flora of Nepal
Flora of East Himalaya
Flora of Tibet
Flora of South-Central China
Flora of Southeast China
Flora of Myanmar
Flora of Vietnam
Plants described in 1862